Hind Turret is a peak at the south (hind) side of Obelisk Mountain in the Asgard Range of Victoria Land, Antarctica. The descriptive name, suggestive of the appearance and position of this peak, was recommended by the Advisory Committee on Antarctic Names in consultation with the New Zealand Antarctic Place-Names Committee.

References

Mountains of the Asgard Range
McMurdo Dry Valleys